Pardoși is a commune in Buzău County, Muntenia, Romania. It is composed of five villages: Chiperu, Costomiru, Pardoși, Valea lui Lalu and Valea Șchiopului.

Notes

Communes in Buzău County
Localities in Muntenia